Lehavot HaBashan (lit. Flames of the Bashan) is a kibbutz in northern Israel. Located in the Hula Valley around ten kilometres southeast of Kiryat Shmona, it falls under the jurisdiction of Upper Galilee Regional Council.

History
The village was established in 1945 on land which had formally belonged to Kibbutz Amir, by former Hashomer Hatzair members  and the Lehavot gar'in, which was composed of immigrants from Germany and Poland brought to the country by Youth Aliyah. Kibbutz Amir had moved north in 1942, to land bought from another Arab village, al-Dawwara, in order to avoid the winter floods.

One of them was Dov Zakin, later a member of the Knesset. In 1947 the kibbutz moved to its present location. The name is derived from that of the founders' gar'in, together with the Golan Heights, also known as Bashan Mountains, which overlook the kibbutz.

Economy

LVT, a fire protection equipment manufacturer that specializes in the development of fire protection and suppression systems for the military, industrial, and commercial sectors, is located on Kibbutz Lehavot HaBashan.

Notable people
 Israel Gutman
 Amiram Levin

References

External links
Different Strokes, New York Magazine, 12 Jun 1989

German-Jewish culture in Israel
Kibbutzim
Kibbutz Movement
Populated places established in 1945
Populated places in Northern District (Israel)
Polish-Jewish culture in Israel
1945 establishments in Mandatory Palestine